Basilica of Constantine can refer to:

 Basilica of Maxentius and Constantine in Rome
 Basilica of Constantine in Trier, Germany